Saudades da Terra is a manuscript that was published by father Gaspar Frutuoso.  It forms a reference work on the knowledge of Macaronesia in the late 16th century.

The manuscript was written between 1586 and 1590, divided into two volumes, based on the author's observations which makes a detailed description of the archipelagos of the Azores, Madeira and the Canary Islands. It also has multiple references on Cape Verde and other Atlantic regions.

It finishes a most important repository on information about geography, history, life usage of clothes, genealogy, toponym, fauna and flora of the mid-Atlantic archipelago before the 17th century, in which closes by the author with a personality of a Renaissance typical humanist: encyclopedic, literary, artistic and music, observed natural phenomenon, pre-occupied with alchemic experimentations and speculating inside the dominions of geology, biology, mineralogy and petrography.

The book contains each of the island chain, the three features one or more islands of the Azores, one was a poem, including:

 Book I - Cape Verde and the Canary Islands
 Book II - Madeira
 Book III - Azores: Santa Maria
 Book IV - Azores: São Miguel;
 Book V - Poem - with fictional characters "Verdade" and "Gama" - typically renaissance persons, in pastoral style - a story of two friends who was forced to live in a house for a long time.
 Book VI - Azores: Terceira, Faial, Pico, Flores, Graciosa and S. Jorge.

The work was completed with a last volume, titled Saudades do Céu, a philosophical-theological dissertation during the Azorean crisis during the Portuguese Succession Crisis of 1580.

Gaspar Frutuoso apparently intended to publish his work, since it was clear that the plight of the manuscript with additional amendments made with his fist.  For reasons which are unknown, it may be linked to the Spanish (or Castilian) occupation during the Philippine Dynasty, he did not, adding it to a library of Colégio dos Jesuítas de Ponta Delgada (Ponta Delgada Jesuit College), which remained until 1760 when the Jesuits were expelled from Portugal.  The manuscript changed hands, in the 1920s, in a context of commemorations of the Tri-Centenary of the Birth of Gaspar Frutuoso in 1922, owned by the Praia e Monforte family, which had prevented access to the work, unfeasible for an chance for its publication.  Later on, it was donated by the General Board of Ponta Delgada and was added to Ponta Delgada Public Library and Archives (also known as the Azorean Public Library and Archives) where it is founded today.

The first part of the book which came to light was Book III in 1873, with thirty notes by Álvaro Rodrigues de Azevedo, and a historic synthesis written by the Portuguese Illustrated Universal Dictionary by Fernandes Costa.. It was followed by a genealogical part of Book IV, published in 1876 by an initiative of Francisco Maria Supico and José Pedro de Jesus Cardoso.  In the 1920s, it was inviable the integral publication of the work was published in two relative volumes on the islands of São Miguel and Santa Maria, for which complete copies were available.  The Book III edition about Santa Maria was in charge of Manuel Monteiro Velho Arruda.  The same copy was taken and later published an edition the first book, based on a manuscript copy that was founded in the Ponta Delgada Public Library and Archives

It has different parcel editions of Saudades da Terra with added editions, added to the Ponta Delgada Cultural Institute in 1966.

An edition was made in 1968 in Ponta Delgada.

See also
History of the Azores
History of Madeira
History of the Canary Islands
History of Cape Verde

References

Further reading
Frutuoso, Gaspar. Saudades da Terra (6 vols.). Ponta Delgada, Azores: Ponta Delgada Cultural Institute, 2005. 124 pages.

External links
Gaspar Frutuoso, Saudades da Terra (1873 edition) 

1873 books
Cultural history of Portugal
History of the Azores
History of Madeira
History of the Canary Islands
16th century in Cape Verde